Fauna of Spain may refer to:

 List of birds of Spain
 List of mammals of Spain
 Wildlife of Spain

See also
 Outline of Spain